The FIBA Americas Under-20 Championship was the American basketball championships for players under 20 years that took place every four years among national teams of the continents. The winners qualified for the now-defunct FIBA Under-21 World Championship. This event had been the FIBA Americas Under-21 Championship, but FIBA decided to lower the age limit for the FIBA 22 & Under World Championship in December 1998, and was renamed as the World Championship for Young Men. In 2004, the name was changed again to FIBA Under-21 World Championship, and the qualifying tournament was renamed to the present FIBA Americas Under-20 Championship.

Results

Participation Details

External links
 2000 Tournament
 United States history via Archive.org

References

Americas
Basketball competitions in the Americas between national teams